Ron or Ronald Daniels is the name of:

 Ronald J. Daniels, president of The Johns Hopkins University
 Ronald Daniels (politician), former U.S. presidential candidate
 Ron Daniels (theatre), director , see Reno Philharmonic Orchestra

See also
Ronald Daniel (disambiguation)